The Roman Catholic Diocese of Coronel Oviedo is a diocese located in the city of Coronel Oviedo in the Ecclesiastical province of Asunción in Paraguay.

History
 On September 10, 1961, the Territorial Prelature of Coronel Oviedo was established from the Diocese of Concepción
 On March 6, 1976, the territorial prelature was promoted as the Diocese of Coronel Oviedo

Leadership, in reverse chronological order
 Bishops of Coronel Oviedo (Roman rite), below
 Bishop Juan Bautista Gavilán Velásquez (December 18, 2001 – present)
 Bishop Ignacio Gogorza Izaguirre, S.C.I. (March 26, 1998 – February 3, 2001), appointed Bishop of Ciudad del Este
 Bishop Claudio Silvero Acosta, S.C.I. (March 15, 1976 – March 26, 1998), appointed Auxiliary Bishop of Encarnación
 Prelate of Coronel Oviedo (Roman Rite), below
 Bishop Jerome Arthur Pechillo, T.O.R. (September 10, 1961 – March 6, 1976), raised to Bishop rank in 1965;  appointed Auxiliary Bishop of Newark, New Jersey, U.S.

References
 GCatholic.org
 Catholic Hierarchy

Roman Catholic dioceses in Paraguay
Christian organizations established in 1961
Roman Catholic dioceses and prelatures established in the 20th century
Coronel Oviedo, Roman Catholic Diocese of
Caaguazú Department
1961 establishments in Paraguay